In the run-up to the 1945 general election, various organisations carry out opinion polling to gauge voting intention. Results of such polls are displayed in this article.

The date range for these opinion polls are from 1943 until late June 1945.

Polling results 
All Data is from PollBase

1943–1945

Pre 1943

References

Opinion polling for United Kingdom general elections